Ladd Farmhouse is a historic home located at Duanesburg in Schenectady County, New York. It was built about 1855 by noted master carpenter Alexander Delos "Boss" Jones.  It is a two-story, three bay, clapboard sided frame farmhouse in the Greek Revival style. It features a gable roof, full entablature encircling the structure, exaggerated cornice returns, and broad corner pilasters.  Also on the property are two contributing barns, a garage, and a shed.

The property was covered in a study of Boss Jones TR

It was listed on the National Register of Historic Places in 1984.

References

Houses on the National Register of Historic Places in New York (state)
Greek Revival houses in New York (state)
Houses completed in 1855
Houses in Schenectady County, New York
National Register of Historic Places in Schenectady County, New York